Jia Liu is an American assistant professor of bioengineering at the Harvard John A. Paulson School of Engineering and Applied Sciences (SEAS). He was recognized as one of the world's top "Innovators Under 35" by MIT Technology Review. His areas of research include nanoelectronics, chemistry, biology, and electrical engineering.

Education
In 2014, Liu earned his Ph.D. from Harvard University. The following year, he went to Stanford University to pursue a postdoctoral fellowship. In 2019, he returned to Harvard University as an assistant professor.

Research
Liu's research focuses on utilizing bioelectronics to investigate inquiries in the field of neuroscience, as well as to design diagnostic and treatment approaches for various conditions related to the nervous system and body development.

Selected publications

>

References

Living people
Year of birth missing (living people)
Biological engineering
Harvard University faculty
Stanford University alumni
Harvard University alumni